Citizen Mani is an Indian comedian who works in Tamil-language films. He has acted in 200 films and television serials. He directed and acted in a film, Perunali, in 2019.

Career 
Mani left his village for Chennai to pursue a career in acting. He played a role as a tea master in Citizen (2001). After garnering acclaim for his portrayal as a tea master, Mani added the moniker 'Citizen' to his stage name. Citizen enabled him to get comedic roles in several films including Anniyan (2005) and Aaru (2005). He made his directorial debut with Perunali (2019).

Filmography 

Mahanadhi (1994)
Citizen (2001)
12B (2001)
 Thavasi (2001)
Devan (2002)
Shree (2002)
Bagavathi (2002)
Bheeshmar (2003)
Ji (2005)
Anniyan (2005)
Daas (2005)
Aaru (2005)
Kurukshetram (2006)
Sengathu (2006)
Maranthen Meimaranthen (2006)
Thaamirabharani (2007)
Muni (2007)
Thunichal (2010)
Vallakottai (2010)
Singam II (2013)
 Sevili (2017)
Hara Hara Mahadevaki (2017)
Aadai (2019)
Perunali (2019; also director)

References

External links 

Citizen Mani on Movie Buff

Living people
Indian male film actors
Indian male comedians
Tamil comedians
Male actors in Tamil cinema
Tamil film directors
Year of birth missing (living people)